The Wide Blue Road is a 1957 Italian romance drama film directed by Gillo Pontecorvo.

Plot
The story follows the harsh rugged life of a poor fisherman on a small island off the Dalmatian coast. In a desperate effort to improve the lives of his family he begins to fish illegally using bombs instead of relying on nets. However this method invokes the hatred of the other fishermen and finally results in tragedy.

Cast
Alida Valli - Rosetta
Yves Montand - Squarciò
Francisco Rabal - Salvatore
Umberto Spadaro - Marshal 
Peter Carsten - Rivo
Federica Ranchi - Diana
Terence Hill - Renato

External links

1957 films
1950s Italian-language films
1957 romantic drama films
Films about fishing
Films set in the Mediterranean Sea
Films directed by Gillo Pontecorvo
Italian romantic drama films
1950s Italian films